KNCO-FM (94.1 FM, "Star 94 FM") is a radio station broadcasting an adult contemporary music format.  Licensed to Grass Valley, California, United States, it serves the Marysville/Yuba City area. The station is currently owned by Nevada County Broadcasters, Inc.

History
On September 7, 1982, KNCO-FM first signed on the air.  It has broadcast an adult contemporary music format for its entire history.

References

External links

NCO-FM
Mainstream adult contemporary radio stations in the United States
Grass Valley, California